An averruncator is a form of long shears used in arboriculture for averruncating or pruning off the higher branches of trees, etc.

Etymology
The word averruncate (from Latin averruncare, "to ward off, remove mischief") glided into meaning to weed the ground, prune vines, etc., by a supposed derivation from the Lat. ab, "off", and eruncare, "to weed out", and it was spelt aberuncate to suit this; but the New English Dictionary regarded such a derivation as impossible.

Description
An averruncator has a compound blade attached to a handle between five and eight feet long. The blades are closed with a rope and pulley, and they are opened with a spring.  There are at least three varieties of this tool, depending on how force is transmitted to the blades or the blade shape: shear-action, pully-action and parrot-bill.

Notes

References

Cutting tools
Gardening tools